Zatrephes amoena is a moth in the family Erebidae. It was described by Paul Dognin in 1924. It is found in French Guiana and Brazil.

References

Phaegopterina
Moths described in 1924